Senator Swain may refer to:

George W. Swain (1824–1904), Wisconsin State Senate
Joshua Swain Jr. (1804–1866), New Jersey State Senate

See also
Senator Swan (disambiguation)